Kari Kola (also Romanized as Karī Kolā) is a village in Valupey Rural District, in the Central District of Savadkuh County, Mazandaran Province, Iran. At the 2006 census, its population was 83, in 23 families.

References 

Populated places in Savadkuh County